Miribel-Lanchâtre is a commune in the Isère department in south-eastern France.

Geography
The main village is Lanchâtre with its church, castle, town-hall, primary school and typical buildings from an old village. The hamlet Le Vernay lies  uphill a mountain road and offers a nice lookout at the cross. There is an ancient farm still working with most modest methods and always worth a visit.

Population

See also
Communes of the Isère department
Parc naturel régional du Vercors

References

Communes of Isère
Isère communes articles needing translation from French Wikipedia